Hiroe Igeta (井桁弘恵 Igeta Hiroe; born 3 February 1997) is a Japanese actress and model.

Early life and education
Igeta obtained her bachelor's in humanities from Waseda University.

Career
In 2012, when she was 15, Igeta was a runner-up in Miss Teen Japan 2013. Her acting debut was in 2016 when she starred in Death Forest 5.

Filmography

Television series

Films

References

External links
 
 

1997 births
Living people
21st-century Japanese actresses
Japanese female models
Models from Fukuoka Prefecture
Waseda University alumni